Justin Michael Robinson (born October 14, 1996) is an American professional basketball player for Elitzur Netanya of the Israeli National League. He played college basketball for the Duke Blue Devils. He is the youngest son of Hall of Fame basketball player David Robinson.

High school career
Robinson attended San Antonio Christian School in San Antonio, Texas. As a senior, he averaged 13.5 points, 10.2 rebounds and 4.6 blocks per game, leading his team to a 33–6 record. Robinson was named to the Texas Association of Private and Parochial Schools 4A All-District First Team.

College career
Robinson expected to play for Duke as a walk-on before accepting a scholarship offer from the program. He redshirted his first season, during which he often guarded Brandon Ingram at practice. He was named a team captain as a senior. 

Robinson was on Duke's 2017 ACC tournament championship team and 2019 ACC tournament championship team.

In the final game of the season, on March 7, 2020, he made his first career start and recorded 13 points, six rebounds, four blocks and three assists in an 89–76 win over North Carolina. It was the third straight game that Robinson had played significant minutes. Coach Mike Krzyzewski compared him to Notre Dame football walk-on Rudy Ruettiger, saying he was better. Robinson finished the season averaging 2.8 points and 1.5 rebounds in 6.8 minutes per game.

In his senior season, Robinson received the 2020 Tedd E. Mann award for his contributions to the team.

Professional career
On September 18, 2020, Robinson signed his first professional contract with Mornar Bar of the Montenegrin League and the ABA League.

On October 6, 2020, Podgorica announced that they had signed Robinson.

Robinson had been included in roster of the San Antonio Spurs for 2021 NBA Summer League. On September 13, 2021, he signed with Mornar Bar of the Montenegrin League and the ABA League.

Career statistics

College

|-
| style="text-align:left;"| 2015–16
| style="text-align:left;"| Duke
| style="text-align:center;" colspan="11"|  Redshirt
|-
| style="text-align:left;"| 2016–17
| style="text-align:left;"| Duke
| 6 || 0 || 1.7 || – || – || .500 || .2 || .0 || .0 || .0 || .2
|-
| style="text-align:left;"| 2017–18
| style="text-align:left;"| Duke
| 17 || 0 || 4.8 || .421 || .353 || .250 || .6 || .1 || .0 || .5 || 1.4
|-
| style="text-align:left;"| 2018–19
| style="text-align:left;"| Duke
| 17 || 0 || 3.4 || .615 || .444 || .000 || .5 || .1 || .1 || .2 || 1.2
|-
| style="text-align:left;"| 2019–20
| style="text-align:left;"| Duke
| 15 || 1 || 6.8 || .516 || .429 || .500 || 1.5 || .5 || .3 || 1.1 || 2.8
|- class="sortbottom"
| style="text-align:center;" colspan="2"| Career
| 55 || 1 || 4.6 || .508 || .404 || .333 || .8 || .2 || .1 || .5 || 1.6

Personal life
His father, David Robinson, was inducted into the Naismith Memorial Basketball Hall of Fame following a 14-year career in the National Basketball Association with the San Antonio Spurs. Robinson's older brother, Corey, played college football for Notre Dame.

Robinson graduated from Duke University with a degree in Psychology and earned a Masters of Management Studies (MMS) degree from Duke's Fuqua School of Business in 2020. While at Duke, Robinson was a 3-time ACC Honor Roll recipient.

References

External links
Duke Blue Devils bio

1996 births
Living people
American expatriate basketball people in Montenegro
American men's basketball players
KK Podgorica players
Small forwards
Power forwards (basketball)
Duke Blue Devils men's basketball players
Basketball players from San Antonio